AIBN can refer to:

 Azobisisobutyronitrile
 Australian Institute for Bioengineering and Nanotechnology
 Norwegian Accident Investigation Board